Wajir South Constituency is an electoral constituency in Kenya. Wajir South is one of the six constituencies in Wajir County. The constituency has seven wards Burder, Dadajabula, Ibrahim ure, Diif, Lagboqol south, Habaswein, and Banane ward, all electing councillors to the Wajir County Council

Members of Parliament

Wards

References 

Constituencies in Wajir County
Constituencies in North Eastern Province (Kenya)
1963 establishments in Kenya
Constituencies established in 1963